João César Gomes Pereira (born 29 December 1975), known as César, is a Portuguese retired footballer who played as a goalkeeper.

Club career
César was born in Barcelos. During his career, spent mostly in Portugal's lower leagues, he played with Gil Vicente FC, F.C. Marinhas, Santa Maria FC, G.D. Joane (two spells), S.C. Valenciano, S.C. Freamunde, S.C. Dragões Sandinenses, C.D. Trofense, F.C. Lixa, Rio Ave F.C. and G.D. Ribeirão.

With the Vila do Conde club, César appeared seven times in the league but only once in the Primeira Liga, on 26 October 2008 in a 1–1 away draw against C.S. Marítimo where he came on as a 90th-minute substitute after Márcio Paiva was sent off. He left Rio Ave in June 2009, and retired the following year at the age of 34.

References

External links

1975 births
Living people
People from Barcelos, Portugal
Portuguese footballers
Association football goalkeepers
Primeira Liga players
Liga Portugal 2 players
Segunda Divisão players
Santa Maria F.C. players
Gil Vicente F.C. players
G.D. Joane players
S.C. Freamunde players
S.C. Dragões Sandinenses players
C.D. Trofense players
F.C. Lixa players
Rio Ave F.C. players
G.D. Ribeirão players
Sportspeople from Braga District